Sky Pilot Mountain is in the Beartooth Mountains in the U.S. state of Montana. The peak is in the Absaroka-Beartooth Wilderness on the borders of Custer and Gallatin National Forests. The Hopper Glacier lies on the east flank of the peak.

References

Sky Pilot
Beartooth Mountains
Mountains of Carbon County, Montana